Madurella grisea is a fungal species of the genus Madurella. Along with Exophiala jeanselmei, Madurella grisea is one of the most common pathogenic agents associated with eumycetoma.

Laboratory characteristics
Colonies of Madurella grisea are slow growing, dark, leathery, and folded with radial grooves and with a light brown to greyish surface mycelium. With age, colonies become dark- to reddish-brown and acquire a brownish-black reverse. Microscopically, cultures are sterile, although hyphae of two widths have been described: thin at 1 to 3 um in width, and broad at 3 to 5 um in width. The optimum temperature of growth for M. grisea is 30C, it does not grow at 37C.  RG-2 organism.

Grains of Madurella grisea (tissue microcolonies) are black, round to lobed, soft to firm, up to 1.0 mm, with two distinctive zones, a hyaline to weakly pigmented central zone and a deeply pigmented periphery.

M. grisea can be distinguished from Madurella mycetomatis by the inability to grow at 37C or assimilate lactose.

MIC data for Madurella grisea is limited.  Antifungal susceptibility testing of individual strains is recommended.

Antifungal	
MIC ug/mL
Antifungal	
MIC ug/mL
Antifungal	
MIC ug/mL
Range
Range
Range
Amphotericin B	
0.25
Itraconazole	
0.5
Voriconazole	
0.5

Clinical significance

The genus Madurella is based on tissue morphology (mycetoma with black grains) and the formation of sterile cultures on mycological media and is in need of revision. Both M. mycetomatis and M. grisea have been isolated from soil and are one of the major causative agents of mycetoma.

Mycosis: Mycetoma

References

Kwon-Chung, K.J. and J.E. Bennett. 1992. Medical Mycology. Lea & Febiger, Philadelphia and London.
http://www.mycology.adelaide.edu.au/Fungal_Descriptions/Hyphomycetes_(hyaline)/Madurella/grisea.html

Sordariales